Željko Veselinović (born 1974) is a Serbian union leader and politician who is currently the president of the United Trade Unions of Serbia "Sloga". He was one of the founders of the Alliance for Serbia which dissolved in 2020 and transformed into the United Opposition of Serbia.

Early life and career 
Veselinović was born in 1974 in Smederevo. He has a degree in economics.

He started working as a trade unionist at the end of 2000 in the then Smederevo Sartid. In 2003, he was elected the youngest union president in the history of the factory. Five years later, he founded "Sloga" and became its second president.

He served as Bojan Pajtić's advisor for labor relations and socio-economic issues, at the time when Pajtić was leading the Government of AP Vojvodina.  As it is pointed out in his official biography: "One of the few people who in his career went through all instances from the shift commissioner in the factory to the president of the national union." He led and organized several strikes and protests, and is a member of the network of trade unionists at the European Left and the European Social Forum. It was speculated that he would run for the presidency of Serbia in 2017 elections, but he did not do that as he decided to endorse Vuk Jeremić.

In 2018, a new opposition Alliance for Serbia was formed and Veselinović's "Sloga" was one of the founding members. Veselinović was also the first chairman of the alliance. He is a member of the City Assembly of Belgrade. The alliance was dissolved in August 2020 and transformed into the United Opposition of Serbia.

In an interview to Danas, he said that he thinks that unions should be more involved in politics.

Personal life 
He speaks English. He is married and has two sons.

References 

1974 births
Living people
Politicians from Smederevo
Serbian trade unionists